Timothy Alexander Cate (born September 30, 1997) is an American professional baseball pitcher in the Washington Nationals organization.

Cate pitched in college for the University of Connecticut Huskies. He was a second-round draft 65th pick of the Washington Nationals in the 2018 Major League Baseball draft.

Career

Amateur career
Cate grew up in Connecticut and attended Howell Cheney Technical High School, where he was a pitcher and outfielder. Despite having a damaged ulnar collateral ligament of the elbow in his dominant left arm, Cate participated in a December 2013 showcase for the University of Connecticut as a junior and was invited to pitch for the program after high school. After undergoing Tommy John surgery, Cate elected not to take the 2014 spring season at Cheney Tech off, simply batting and throwing right-handed.

While at Connecticut, Cate pitched for USA Baseball's collegiate team in 2016 and 2017. In 2017, he briefly played collegiate summer baseball with the Bourne Braves of the Cape Cod Baseball League. In 2018, his season was interrupted by discomfort in his left arm that led the Huskies to shut him down before he returned at the end of the spring. Across three seasons as a Huskie, Cate pitched to a 2.99 ERA in 37 games, starting 32.

Professional career
Originally projected to be drafted by a Major League Baseball team in the first round or toward the beginning of the second round of the 2018 draft as a college junior, Cate fell to 65th overall after the forearm injury. The Washington Nationals, which drafted him, declared confidence in his health in spite of the time missed during Cate's season. Cate told his hometown newspaper, the Journal Inquirer, that he was glad to be drafted by a National League team because he likes to hit (a reference to the American League's designated hitter rule). He signed a professional contract with Washington on June 12, 2018, for $986,200. Cate made his professional debut with the Auburn Doubledays, the Nationals' Class A Short Season affiliate, on June 28, 2018. He was promoted to the Class A Hagerstown Suns in August. In 13 games (12 starts) between the two clubs, Cate went 2-6 with a 5.02 ERA. He returned to Hagerstown to begin the 2019 season. 

Cate started 2019 with the Hagerstown Suns where he made 13 starts. Through those starts he compiled 70.1 IP with a 2.82 ERA. He was 4-5 while striking out 73 and only walking 13. He was promoted to the Potomac Nationals at the season midway point. He also made 13 starts with the Nationals and tallied 73.1 IP, 7–4 win–loss record, 3.31 ERA, 73 K's and 13 BB's. Over the full season his stat line totaled 11-9, 3.07 ERA, 143.2 IP, 139 K's, 32 BB's and a 1.14 WHIP.  This season earned him the National's Minor League Pitcher of the Year as voted on by both MLB Pipeline and the Nationals.

Pitching style
Though his left hand is dominant, Cate has good enough control and strength in his right arm that his college coach at the University of Connecticut, Jim Penders, described him as "ambidextrous". Washington Nationals scouting director Kris Kline described his curveball as one of the best left-handed curves in the 2018 draft class.

References

External links

1997 births
Living people
Sportspeople from Manchester, Connecticut
Baseball players from Connecticut
Baseball pitchers
UConn Huskies baseball players
Bourne Braves players
Auburn Doubledays players
Hagerstown Suns players
Potomac Nationals players